El Bordj District is a district of Mascara Province, Algeria.

Municipalities
The district is further divided into 3 municipalities:
El Bordj
Khalouia
El Menaouer

Districts of Mascara Province